Trivarnam (Telugu: త్రివర్ణం) (Every Indian Heartbeat) is a first patriotic video album in Telugu, directed by Bulemoni Venkateshwarlu,  produced by Pirati Kondalarao and Pirati Naveen in the banner of Surya Sellulloids in 2005. Trivarnam got appreciation from the President of India in 2005. 

It was released worldwide through Aditya Music. 

Trivarnam was a chart buster video album in the United States in 2005 in the Telugu music division.

Lyrics

 Nannu Kadipe..Nannu Kadipe
 Singers: Karthik, S P Balu  
 Lyricist: B Venkateshwarlu  
Bharatavani
 Singers: Nishma 
 Lyricist: B Venkateshwarlu 
 Ennallo Gadichaka
 Singers: Srikanth 
 Lyricist: Vemuri Viswanath 
 Aho Dheeravanitha
 Singers: Tina 
 Lyricist: Vemuri Viswanath 
 Oke Maata
 Singers: Srikanth 
 Lyricist: Vemuri Viswanath 
Poddula Tolipoddula
 Singers: S P Balu 
 Lyricist: Vemuri Viswanath

External links
 YouTube: Nannu Kadipe Nannu Kadipe
 YouTube: Bharathavani 
 YouTube: Ennallo Gadichaka
 Cinetaria.com

2005 video albums